Goliath and the Barbarians is a 1959 Italian peplum film loosely based on events of the Lombard invasion of Italy in AD 568.  As with many Italian peplums of the time, the English dubbed version renamed some of the characters (for example, "Emiliano" became "Goliath").

Plot
Set in the 6th century, it follows the start of barbarian invasions and deals with one group that attacks a village and destroys anyone and anything that is there. One man, Emiliano, son of the village leader, is away at the time of attack. He swears revenge and wages a one-man war against the evil tribes. He also is helped by the survivors and his sister Lynda. He wears a lion head mask to instill fear into the hearts of the barbarians.

Cast

US Release
American International Pictures released the film in the US with a new score by Les Baxter. The film had originally been a Hercules movie but AIP decided rename it a Goliath film to avoid confusion with Hercules (1959). AIP invested $20,000 in the movie to help the producers complete it and were rewarded when it became a big hit. The film earned $1.6 million in North America during its initial release where it was double billed with Sign of the Gladiator Arkoff later estimated the film earned a gross of $1.8 million.

AIP announced plans to make a follow up called Goliath and the Dragon from a script by Lou Rusoff with Debra Paget but this fell through and they ended up buying another Italian film called The Revenge of Hercules and simply renaming it Goliath and the Dragon.

DVD Releases
This film was released on a limited edition DVD by Wild East Productions in 2007 as a double feature with Goliath and the Vampires.

See also
 list of historical drama films
 Late Antiquity

References

External links
 

1959 films
Films set in the 6th century
Peplum films
1950s historical films
1950s Italian-language films
English-language Italian films
Films directed by Carlo Campogalliani
Sword and sandal films
1950s Italian films